Kadaikutty Singam is a 2019 Tamil-language soap opera starring Mohammed Azeem,  Shivani Narayanan  /  Iraa Agarwal, Nimeshika Krishnan, Dr. Sharmila . It started airing on Vijay TV from 11 March 2019 and ended on 20 August 2019 for 115 Episodes.

Cast

Main Cast
 Shivani Narayanan / Iraa Agarwal as Meenakshi (Indira's younger daughter, Yazhini's sister and Maruthu's love interest)
 Mohammed Azeem as Maruthu (Shivankala's and Malar's son, Muthu's and Naachiyaar's younger brother)
 Aryan as Muthu (Shivankala's and Malar's son, Maruthu and Naachiyaar's brother)

Supporting
 Nimeshika Radhakrishnan as Neelambari (Naachiyaar's daughter)
 Dr. Sharmila as Naachiyaar (Shivakala's and Malar elder daughter, Maruthu and Muthu's sister, Neelambari's mother)
 Nalinikanth as Shivankala (Maruthu, Muthu and Naachiyaar's father, Neelambari's grandfather)
 K. Natraj as Muthuramalingam (Sivankala and Indira's father, Maruthu, Muthu, Mennakshi, Naachiyaar and Yazhini's grandfather, Neelambari and Megala's great-grandfather)
 Sumangali as Malar Shivankala (Maruthu, Muthu and Naachiyaar's mother, Neelambari's grandmother)
 Shruti Selvam as Yazhini (Meenakshi's sister, Indira's elder daughter)
 Sathya as Sathya (Malar's nephew, Maruthu and Muthu's cousin)
 Baby Megala (Yazhini's daughter)
 Sangeetha V as Indira (Meenakshi and Yazhini's mother, Megala's grandmother)
 Mani K. L. as Mani (Muthu's friend)
 David Solomon Raja as Vaanavarayan
 Gemini as Priya's father
 Nivisha Kingston as Priya(Muthu's love interest)

Casting
Pagal Nilavu fame Shivani Narayanan and Mohammed Azeem was selected to portray the lead roles. Later Shivani Narayanan left the series due to certain reasons she was replaced by Irra Agarwal, Ganga and Kanmani serials fame. Other supporting cast includes Velu Lakshmanan, Nimeshika, Dr. Sharmila, Nalinikanth and Mani K. L.. The official teaser has been released by Star Vijay in Youtube on 26 February 2019.

Title 
This title was taken from a 2018 feature film Kadaikutty Singam starring Karthi and Sayyeshaa.

References

External links
Official website at Hotstar

Star Vijay original programming
2010s Tamil-language television series
2019 Tamil-language television series debuts
Tamil-language television shows
Tamil-language romance television series
2019 Tamil-language television series endings